Polytechnic-School for the new science
() is a high school located in Polytechnical Academy-New Belgrade, Serbia.

Pupils enter school by taking Serbian High school examination. The school is futuristic organized- 
"4 years" programme consisting of computer application in mechanical engineering, programming on CNC machines, and robotics.

Education 

11.04.2006: Polytechnic-School for the new science is an independent school.
The school is unique in Serbia. There is laboratory for programming, graphic simulation, computer graphics, and a CNC lab.
"Polytechnic" students are taking places in blood donations, tournaments and sport activities in Belgrade.

External links 
 

Schools in Serbia